Bahmani (also Romanized as Bahmanī and Behmani; also known as Bahmanū) is a village in Bandar Charak Rural District, Shibkaveh District, Bandar Lengeh County, Hormozgan Province, Iran. At the 2006 census, its population was 94, in 18 families.

References 

Populated places in Bandar Lengeh County